The Trojan Women Set Fire to their Fleet is a mid-17th century painting by French artist Claude Lorrain. Done in oil on canvas, the painting is currently in the collection of the Metropolitan Museum of Art.

Description 
Claude Lorrain painted The Trojan Women Set Fire to their Fleet around 1643 at the behest of Cardinal Girolamo Farnese. The scene is Lorrain's take on a famed event in Book 5 of the Aeneid in which the exiled women of Troy, spurred on by the Greek goddess Juno, burn the Trojan fleet to force their men to stop roaming and settle in Sicily. However, Aeneas prays to the god Jupiter to save the ships from the flames by summoning a rainstorm; this is alluded to by Lorrain via his inclusion of dark clouds in the top right of the painting.

Lorrain's choice of scene carries additional subtext, as his patron commissioned the painting after returning to Rome from an extensive period of work abroad, with Trojan Women thus evoking thoughts of an end to wandering. According to the Met, the painting later inspired British maritime artist J. M. W. Turner.

References 

1643 paintings
Paintings in the collection of the Metropolitan Museum of Art
Paintings by Claude Lorrain
Maritime paintings
Paintings based on the Aeneid